Theophilus Harris Davies (4 January 1834 – 25 May 1898) was an English businessman. He was the founder of  Theo H. Davies & Co., one of Hawaii's "Big Five" sugar firms.

Life 
Davies was born in Stourbridge, Worcestershire, England, the son of a Welsh minister and his English wife.
He was recruited in England to join the firm of Janion, Green & Co. in Hawaii, a successor to Starkey, Janion & Co., formed in 1845. Partners were Robert Cheshire Janion and William Lowthian Green.

Davies arrived in 1857 but returned to England in 1862, where he stayed until 1867. He then returned to Honolulu, to bail out Janion. By January 1868, Davies controlled the business and it was being operated as Theo. H. Davies and Company.

His second son was George Frederick Davies (1875–1950) who served in Parliament. Another son Arthur Whitcliffe Davies (1878–1966), who became the Dean of Worcester, was born later that year in Honolulu.

Under the laws of the Provisional Government, it became Theo H. Davies & Co., Limited, in January 1894. It grew to become one of Hawaii's "Big Five" sugar firms. He acted as a guardian of Princess Kaʻiulani while she travelled to Europe and the United States. Davies died on 25 May 1898.

References

Further reading 
 

Businesspeople from Hawaii
1833 births
1898 deaths
Ambassadors of the United Kingdom to Hawaii
People from Stourbridge
Hawaiian Kingdom businesspeople
19th-century British businesspeople